Ungmennafélagið Þróttur, commonly known as Þróttur Vogum, is an Icelandic sports club from the town of Vogar.

Basketball

Men's basketball
In 2007, Þróttur men's team won the 2. deild karla and were promoted to the second-tier 1. deild karla. The following season, it finished last in the 1. deild karla and were relegated back to 2. deild karla. After not fielding a team for several seasons, Þróttur returned to the national tournament in 2020 and registered a team in the 3. deild karla. In 2022, the team finished as the runner-up in the 2. deild karla.

Notable players

Honors
 2. deild karla:
Winners: 2007

Football

Men's football
In 2017, the men's football team finished second in the 3. deild karla and was promoted to the third tier of Icelandic football for the first time in the club's history. In July 2020, the team hired former Icelandic international player Hermann Hreiðarsson as its manager. Later that month, former English international player David James served as an assistant for Hermann during one game.

Honors
 3. deild karla:
Runner-up: 2017

Current squad

References

External links 
 Official website
 Profile at Football Association of Iceland

Basketball teams in Iceland
Football clubs in Iceland
Association football clubs established in 1932
1932 establishments in Iceland